Hugo Wilhelm Kettler (3 January 1895) was a  German signals officer with the rank of colonel in the German Army. In October 1943, Kettler became director of the OKW/Chi, the cipher Department of the High Command of the Wehrmacht. Kettler remained in command of the unit, until it was dissolved on 15 April 1945.

References

1895 births
German Army personnel of World War I
German Army officers of World War II
Year of death missing
People from Hagen
Military personnel from North Rhine-Westphalia